Paolo Palmacci (born 17 May 1984), is an Italian beach soccer player who plays as a midfielder, having originally started as a forward.

He has appeared at eight editions of the FIFA Beach Soccer World Cup representing the Italian national team, earning a silver medal on two occasions (2008 and 2019), and, as of 2019, is the most-capped Italian player ever.

Career
Palmacci began playing football aged 6. He originally pursued association football, making appearances in both Serie D and Serie C1.

In 2003, aged 19, he started playing beach soccer, in his hometown of Terracina. In 2005, he began competing for the city's beach soccer club in the LND Serie A, Italy's national beach soccer league.

Palmacci was first called up to the Italian national team in 2006, aged 22, for an exhibition tournament in Réunion. He was subsequently a surprise inclusion in Italy's final 12-man squad for the 2006 FIFA Beach Soccer World Cup a month later.

At the 2008 World Cup, he scored his self-proclaimed favourite ever beach soccer goal, an overhead kick in the quarter-final victory over France. He then went on to score one of Italy's three goals in the defeat against Brazil in the final.

In 2011, he won the domestic treble with Terracina (league, cup and super cup).

Palmacci became Italy's all-time record appearance maker at the 2015 European Games in Baku, overtaking the previous holder, Michele Leghissa.

At the 2017 World Cup qualifiers in September 2016, Palmacci reached 189 goals for his country, becoming Italy's all-time record goalscorer, surpassing Roberto Pasquali. However, he has since relinquished this record to Gabriele Gori. He also made his 200th appearance for Italy at the tournament, against Poland in the semi-finals.

After 11 years with Terracina, Palmacci made a "shock" move to rival club Catania in 2017. Later that year, Palmacci reached the milestone of 200 goals for Italy in an 11–4 victory against Ukraine during the Superfinal of the Euro Beach Soccer League. In 2019, he was one of just two surviving Italian players to play in the World Cup final against Portugal, having also played Italy's only previous final in 2008.

Statistics

Honours
As of 2019 season

The following is a selection, not an exhaustive list, of the major honours Palmacci has achieved with Italy:

Team
FIFA Beach Soccer World Cup
Runner-up (2): 2008, 2019
Euro Beach Soccer League
Winner (1): 2018
Runner-up (1): 2010
Mediterranean Beach Games
Gold medal (1): 2015
European Games
Silver medal (1): 2015
UEFA qualifiers for the FIFA Beach Soccer World Cup:
Runner-up (1): 2019

Individual
Euro Beach Soccer League (6):
Superfinal:
Top scorer: 2009, 2016
Regular season stages:
Top scorer: 2009 x1, 2012 x1
Best player: 2012 x1, 2019 x1

References

External links
Paolo Palmacci, profile at Beach Soccer Worldwide

1984 births
Living people
Italian footballers
Italian beach soccer players
Association football midfielders
European Games silver medalists for Italy
Beach soccer players at the 2015 European Games
European Games medalists in beach soccer
Beach soccer players at the 2019 European Games